Shi Jingjing (born ) is a Chinese female  track cyclist. She competed in the 500 m time trial event at the 2014 UCI Track Cycling World Championships.

Major results
2014
3rd Sprint, Hong Kong International Track Cup
2015
3rd  Team Sprint, Asian Track Championships (with Li Xuemei)

References

External links
 Profile at cyclingarchives.com

1988 births
Living people
Chinese track cyclists
Chinese female cyclists
Place of birth missing (living people)
21st-century Chinese women